Empire Oak was a  ocean-going tug which was built by Goole Shipbuilding & Repairing Co. Ltd. of Goole. The ship was launched on 15 March 1941 and completed in July 1941.

She was armed with a 12-pounder and two Hotchkiss machine guns. She also carried two PAC (parachute and cable) rockets.

Ship History
She sailed from Oban on 15 August 1941, captained by F.E. Christian, and joined Convoy OG 71 (Outward Gibraltar).

19 August 1941
On returning to the convoy Captain F.E. Christian spotted starshells going up, on arrival he spotted a number of red lights in the water which he took to be the red lights attached to merchantmen's lifejackets (at this time Royal Navy lifejackets didn't). These were survivors from the merchantman Aguila, and after a long search Empire Oak picked up six crew members.

22 August 1941
She sank within seconds with the captain been washed off the bridge. The destroyer  then launched a depth charge attack on U-564, the shock waves of which caused distress and injuries to the survivors in the water. Captain Christian was in the water for over two hours with his chief officer plus the chief officer from Aguila before the corvette  found them, unfortunately during the rescue the chief officer from the Aguila became separated and was lost.

Empire Oak lost 14 out of her 20 crew, she was also carrying 6 survivors from Aguila and 11 from Alva, nine of these were lost including all from Aguila.

References 

Empire ships
1941 ships
Ships sunk by German submarines in World War II
World War II shipwrecks in the Atlantic Ocean